Witch Hill (The Salem Martyr) is a painting, of a convicted witch, soon to be executed, by hanging, during the Salem witch trials. In her eyes, the look of pain is obvious, of an innocent who is powerless to change her fate.

On the painting

Thomas Noble posed a young woman as the condemned witch, who worked as a librarian in the Cincinnati library. She was a lineal descendant of a woman who was hanged as a witch in 1692, in Salem, Massachusetts; see Salem witch trials.

The painting's frame is made of heavy walnut. It was made for the canvas by an English woodcarver, one William H. Fry.

At the 1869 Cincinnati Industrial Exposition, the painting won a silver medal. Thomas Satterwhite Noble used the Salem witch trials for powerful moral theme.

As of 2022, the painting is on display at the New York Historical Society.

See also

 Cultural depictions of the Salem witch trials
 History of the Puritans in North America
 List of people of the Salem witch trials
 Protests against early modern witch trials
 Timeline of the Salem witch trials
 Witchcraft
 Witches' mark

References

External links and references

 One reference about the painting
 An artnet reference
 A photo of the painting, with the frame

1869 paintings
Salem witch trials
1853 paintings
New-York Historical Society